Kooser State Park is a  Pennsylvania state park in Jefferson Township, Somerset County, Pennsylvania, in the United States. The park, which borders Forbes State Forest, was built in the 1930s by the Civilian Conservation Corps, who also built the  Kooser Lake by damming Kooser Run. Kooser State Park is on Pennsylvania Route 31 a one-hour drive from Pittsburgh. The park is surrounded by Forbes State Forest.

History
The earliest settlers to the Kooser Run area told of an American Indian battle that took place near Kooser Run. A large number of war arrows and spearheads have since been found in the area. The area was also crossed by participants in the Whiskey Rebellion. The park is named for John Kooser. He settled near Kooser Spring in what is now the western edge of Kooser State Park.

The Commonwealth of Pennsylvania purchased the land for Kooser State Park in 1922. The land had been stripped of its old-growth forest during the lumber era that swept through Pennsylvania during the late 19th and early 20th centuries. The forests slowly grew back with the help of the Civilian Conservation Corps. The CCC established by President Franklin D. Roosevelt during the Great Depression built a camp on the western edge of Kooser State Park. The young men of the CCC built the dam on Kooser Run creating Kooser Lake. They also built roads, outdoor fireplaces and cabins. Much of their work can still be seen today at Kooser State Park. They used the materials at hand to create the buildings and facilities of the park. The cabins are made from logs plucked from the nearby forests. They used native stone to create the fireplaces. All repairs made to the park facilities today are made with the rustic nature of the park in mind.

The Kooser State Park Family Cabin District was listed on the National Register of Historic Places in 1987, as a national historic district. The district includes 13 contributing buildings.

Recreation

Cabins and camping
There are nine cabins built by the CCC available for rent year-round. The cabins are primarily used by skiers after deer season until late March. The cabins are rustic. A modern showerhouse is nearby. All of the cabins are furnished with mattresses, chairs, table, stove, microwave, refrigerator, hot and cold running water, and electric lights.

The campground at Kooser State Park is open the second Friday in April and closes in mid-October. There are 47 sites that are open to tents or campers. 14 of the campsites have electric hook ups.

Trails
The trails of Kooser State Park are used for hiking and cross-country skiing. It is very popular with cross country skiers because of the heavy amounts of yearly snowfall. Hunting is not permitted at Kooser State Park, but the trails are used by hunters who rent cabins at the park to reach the woods of Forbes State Forest.

Kooser Lake
Kooser Lake is a  man-made lake built during the Great Depression by the Civilian Conservation Corps. The swimming beach is open from Memorial Day weekend until the middle of September. There are no lifeguards. There is no swimming currently permitted in Kooser Lake. Boating is not permitted on Kooser Lake. It is open to fishing for trout, bass and bluegill.
Swimming has not been permitted at the lake since mid-2012 due to an unhealthful algae problem.  The lake remains open for fishing.  As of August 2016, according to a Park Ranger the Commonwealth of Pennsylvania will work on the lake to deepen it in 2017.

Nearby state parks
The following state parks are within  of Kooser State Park:
Casselman River Bridge State Park (Maryland)
Keystone State Park (Westmoreland County)
Laurel Hill State Park (Somerset County)
Laurel Mountain State Park (Westmoreland County)
Laurel Ridge State Park (Cambria, Fayette, Somerset, and Westmoreland counties)
Laurel Summit State Park (Westmoreland County)
Linn Run State Park (Westmoreland County)
New Germany State Park (Maryland)
Ohiopyle State Park (Fayette County)

References

External links

  

State parks of Pennsylvania
Parks in Somerset County, Pennsylvania
Laurel Highlands
Historic districts in Somerset County, Pennsylvania
Protected areas established in 1922
Civilian Conservation Corps in Pennsylvania
Historic districts on the National Register of Historic Places in Pennsylvania
National Register of Historic Places in Somerset County, Pennsylvania
Protected areas of Somerset County, Pennsylvania